Ofori is a quite popular Ghanaian surname. Notable people with the surname include:

Bennett Ofori (born 1995), Ghanaian footballer
Curtis Ofori (born 2005), American soccer player
David Ofori-Adjei (born 1949), Ghanaian physician and medical researcher
Ebenezer Ofori (born 1995), Ghanaian footballer
Eric Ofori Antwi (born 1994), Ghanaian footballer
Gideon Ofori Offei (born 1999), Ghanaian footballer
Julius Ofori (born 1999), Ghanaian footballer
Kelvin Ofori (born 2001), Ghanaian footballer
Ken Ofori-Atta (born 1958), Ghanaian investment banker and politician
Kofi Asante Ofori-Atta (1912–1978), Ghanaian politician
Lawrence Ofori (born 1998), Ghanaian footballer
Matthew Ofori Dunga (born 1994), Ghanaian footballer
McCarthy Ofori (born 2005), Ghanaian footballer
Nana Ofori-Twumasi (born 1990), English footballer
Nana Sir Ofori Atta I (1881–1943), Okyenhene, king of Akyem Abuakwa kingdom
Oral Ofori (born 1980), Ghanaian-American blogger and journalist
Pearl Akanya Ofori (born 1984), Ghanaian broadcast journalist
Peter Ofori-Quaye (born 1980), Ghanaian footballer
Prince Ofori (born 1988), Ghanaian-Beninese footballer
Richard Ofori (defender) (born 1993), Ghanaian footballer defender
Richard Ofori (goalkeeper) (born 1993), Ghanaian football goalkeeper
Willem Ofori-Appiah (born 1994), Belgian footballer
William Ofori Atta (1910–1988), Ghanaian lawyer and politician

Surnames of Akan origin